Alan Roderick Rough  (born 25 November 1951) is a Scottish former footballer who played as a goalkeeper. He won 53 caps for Scotland and played in two FIFA World Cups. He also had a long club career, principally with Partick Thistle and Hibernian.

Since retiring as a player, Rough had a spell as manager of junior club Glenafton Athletic and has worked in the media, particularly on radio phone-in shows.

Early life
Rough was born in Glasgow and was educated at Knightswood Secondary School.

Playing career

Club
After making his debut at the end of season 1969–70, Rough went on to play a total of 631 games for Partick Thistle in all competitions (409 in the league), which are all-time club record totals. He was a member of the Jags team that defeated Celtic 4–1 in the 1971 Scottish League Cup Final.

Rough told The Scotsman in 2010:
"I loved playing for Thistle, loved winning the League Cup with them, and maybe I stayed there too long but that was me. I never thought about 'career' and I never bothered about money. All of my business ventures – the pub in Maryhill, the sports shop in Musselburgh – failed. But I absolutely loved standing in the Wembley tunnel next to these English stars like Kevin Keegan and Emlyn Hughes when I was on 40 quid a week at Thistle, when the previous week at Firhill the crowd had been 2100, and we were about to walk on to the park and enjoy a famous win."

Shortly after his testimonial game in 1982 (Scotland XI vs Celtic), Rough transferred to Hibernian for a £60,000 fee. He was eventually replaced by Andy Goram, who also took his place in the Scotland squad.

After leaving Hibs in 1988, Rough played in the United States with Orlando Lions. He also had spells with Celtic (covering for the injured Pat Bonner), Hamilton Academical and Ayr United before leaving senior football.

International
He was chosen for the Scotland under-18s for the UEFA under-18 Euros held on home soil in 1970.

Rough played in two FIFA World Cup tournaments for Scotland, in 1978 and 1982. He played 53 times for his country, keeping a clean sheet in 16 of those games. Rough was Scotland's most capped goalkeeper at the time of his retirement, but that record was broken by Jim Leighton.

Rough's penultimate cap was won in the tragic circumstances of the 1–1 draw with Wales at Ninian Park, Cardiff in 1985. Rough came on as a half-time substitute because Leighton had lost his contact lenses. The result, secured by a late Davie Cooper penalty kick, meant that Scotland qualified for a play-off against Australia, but manager Jock Stein collapsed and died at the end of the match. Rough was selected for the finals squad by Alex Ferguson, but only played in one further international.

After playing

Coaching
Rough had a successful five-year spell as the manager (initially player-manager) of Junior club Glenafton Athletic after being appointed in 1990. He led the team to three Scottish Junior Cup finals in a row between 1991–92 to 1993–94, also reaching the semi-finals in 1990–91 and 1994–95. Glenafton lost 4–0 to Auchinleck Talbot in the 1992 final and 1–0 to Largs Thistle in the 1994 final, but did beat Tayport 1–0 in the 1993 final at Firhill Stadium (Rough's home ground for much of his playing career), winning the trophy for the first time. The team also added the Ayrshire First Division title and the Ayrshire Cup to make it a treble in 1992–93, the most successful season in the club's history.

Media work
Rough co-presented a football phone-in show on Real Radio Scotland until July 2012, when the station replaced the phone-in with music. From August 2006 to June 2009, the Irish sports broadcaster Setanta Sports simulcasted the show live twice a week on Setanta Sports 1.

He later co-presented a football show along with Peter Martin shown on STV2 and STV.

Director
Rough was appointed to the Partick Thistle board of directors in June 2018, and he resigned from this position in July 2019.

Personal life 
Rough married Margaret Barry, a Daily Mirror reporter, in 2009 after a seventeen-year engagement. Barry has two children from a previous relationship. Rough was previously married to Michelle, a former model and Tennent's girl. Michelle and Alan had one son, also named Alan.

Rough was appointed Member of the Order of the British Empire (MBE) in the 2022 Birthday Honours for services to association football and to charity in Scotland.

Career statistics

International

Honours

Player 

Partick Thistle
Scottish League Cup: 1971–72
Scottish First Division: 1970–71, 1975–76 (second tier)
Glasgow Cup: 1980–81

Scotland national team

British Home Championship: 1975–76, 1976–77
Rous Cup: 1985

Manager

Glenafton Athletic

Scottish Junior Cup: 1992–93
Ayrshire First Division: 1992–93
Ayrshire Junior Cup: 1992–93
Ayrshire District Cup: 1993–94

Individual 

SFWA Footballer of the Year: 1980–81
Scottish FA International Roll of Honour: 1982
Partick Thistle Hall of Fame: Inducted, 2010
Hibernian Hall of Fame: Inducted, 2012
 Scottish Football Hall of Fame: Inducted, 2013
Glenafton Athletic Hall of Fame: Inducted, 2017

See also
 List of footballers in Scotland by number of league appearances (500+)

References

Further reading

External links 

1951 births
Living people
Footballers from Glasgow
People educated at Knightswood Secondary School
American Soccer League (1988–89) players
Ayr United F.C. players
Celtic F.C. players
Association football goalkeepers
Glenafton Athletic F.C. managers
Scottish Junior Football Association managers
Hamilton Academical F.C. players
Hibernian F.C. players
Orlando Lions players
Partick Thistle F.C. players
Scottish expatriate footballers
Scottish footballers
Scottish Football League players
Scotland international footballers
1978 FIFA World Cup players
1982 FIFA World Cup players
1986 FIFA World Cup players
Scottish Football League representative players
Expatriate soccer players in the United States
Scottish Junior Football Association players
Glenafton Athletic F.C. players
Scottish football managers
Scottish expatriate sportspeople in the United States
Scotland under-23 international footballers
Scottish Football Hall of Fame inductees
Members of the Order of the British Empire